

Æthelwulf was an Anglo-Saxon Bishop of Selsey.

Æthelwulf was in office in AD811, as he was present at the synod of London in that year. He was still active in 816 when he attended the synod of Chelsea.
He attested several Anglo-Saxon Charters:
S165 - (AD811) Cenwulf granting land to Beornmod.
S168 - (AD811) Cenwulf selling land to Wulfred.
S170 - (AD812) Cenwulf granting land to Wulfred.
S180 - (AD816) Cenwulf granting privileges to Deneberht.
S201 - (AD851) Beorhtwulf granting land to St Mary's, Worcester.

Æthelwulf died between 816 and 824.

Notes

Citations

References

Further reading

 

Bishops of Selsey
9th-century English bishops
9th-century deaths
Year of birth unknown